Kirova is a rural locality (a khutor) in Yalchinsky Selsoviet, Kugarchinsky District, Bashkortostan, Russia. The population was 11 as of 2010. There is 1 street.

Geography 
Kirova is located 45 km northwest of Mrakovo (the district's administrative centre) by road. Khudayberdino is the nearest rural locality.

References 

Rural localities in Kugarchinsky District